Events from the year 1687 in China.

Incumbents 
 Kangxi Emperor (26th year)

Events 

 Five French Jesuits arrive in Beijing and later help the emperor in the Bureau of Astronomy and in the field of medicine
 The imperial court promulgates a plan requiring garrison officers to ascertain that candidates (whether Manchu, Mongol, or Chinese) were in some degree proficient in horsemanship and archery before being admitted to the entry-level imperial examinations
 Sino-Russian border conflicts

Births
 Li Wei (1687?–1738) a native of Xuzhou, Jiangsu and instrumental in carrying out Yongzheng's nationwide reforms in his role in various regional governing positions.

Deaths
 Frederick Coyett (Chinese: 揆一), born in Stockholm c. 1615, buried in Amsterdam on 17 October 1687, was a Swedish nobleman and the last colonial governor for the Dutch colony of Formosa
 Geng Juzhong (1650–1687) was the third son of Geng Jimao, brother of Revolt of the Three Feudatories participant Geng Jingzhong and court member of the Qing dynasty. He was a Third Class Viscount (三等子)

References

 
 .

 
China